

Seeds
Champion seeds are indicated in bold text while text in italics indicates the round in which those seeds were eliminated. All four seeded teams received byes to the second round.

 Frew McMillan /  Ilie Năstase (quarterfinals)
 Tom Gorman /  Stan Smith (quarterfinals)
 Jimmy Connors /  Ion Ţiriac (quarterfinals)
 Jan Kodeš /  František Pala (second round)

Draw

Final

Top half

Bottom half

External links
 1972 Paris Open Doubles draw

Doubles